The Sudan People's Liberation Movement (SPLM; , Al-Ḥarakat ash-Shaʿbiyyat liTaḥrīr as-Sūdān) is a political party in South Sudan. It was initially founded as the political wing of the Sudan People's Liberation Army (SPLA; a key belligerent of the Second Sudanese Civil War) in 1983. On January 9, 2005 the SPLA, SPLM and Government of Sudan signed the Comprehensive Peace Agreement, ending the civil war. SPLM then obtained representation in the Government of Sudan, and was the main constituent of the Government of the then semi-autonomous Southern Sudan. When South Sudan became a sovereign state on 9 July 2011, SPLM became the ruling party of the new republic. SPLM branches in Sudan separated themselves from SPLM, forming the Sudan People's Liberation Movement-North. Further factionalism appeared as a result of the 2013-2014 South Sudanese Civil War, with President Salva Kiir leading the SPLM-Juba and former Vice President Riek Machar leading the Sudan People's Liberation Movement-in-Opposition.

Although the party has not adhered to one consistent ideology since the independence of South Sudan and by extension the effective end of the New Sudan concept, and many factions exist, it has been described as "being on the left of centre ideological[ly] speaking," and section IV.2 of the party manifesto states support for a regulated market economy with similar elements to social democracy.

History

The SPLM as a rebel movement was formed on 16 May 1983, after the Sudan government's abandonment of the Addis Ababa agreement signed between the Gaafar Nimeiry government and the Anyanya leader Joseph Lagu, who had first introduced the Southern Sudanese to the effective political, economic, social, educational, and religious situations they would face after Sudan's independence. The movement published a manifesto setting out its positions and attracted a group of rebellious south Sudanese soldiers of the Sudanese Army based in Bor, Pochalla, and Ayod (first called the Bor Mutiny). These joined remnants of the Anyanya rebels of the First Sudanese Civil War based in Ethiopia. Founders of the SPLA (the military wing of the movement) included Captain Salva Kiir Mayardit, Samuel AbuJohn Khabas, Major William Nyuon Bany, Major Kerubino Kuanyin Bol and many other South Sudanese officers of the Sudan armed forces. Joseph Oduho was made chairman of the SPLM and Colonel John Garang, a Dinka army officer, was made commander of the SPLA. Later Oduho was deposed by Garang, who made himself overall leader of the combined movement (SPLA/M).

The government of Sudan has been associated with Islam and Arab descent and culture since then, in deep contrast with the SPLA, associated instead with Africanism, indigenous beliefs, African culture and, in a measure, Christianity.

It fought against the governments of Gaafar Nimeiry, Sadiq al-Mahdi and Omar Hasan Ahmad al-Bashir in what is now called the Second Sudanese Civil War. SPLA/M's declared aim was to establish a democratic Sudan with it as the leading party in control of the southern areas. The war has been largely described in religious and ethnic terms, and also as a struggle for control of the water and oil resources located in southern and western Sudan.

In 1991, the SPLA-Nasir faction led by Dr Riek Machar and Dr Lam Akol attempted to overthrow chairman Garang. The attempt failed but led to widespread fighting in the south and the formation of other rebel groups, such as Kerubino Kwanyin Bol's SPLA Bahr-al-Ghazal faction. These internal divisions hampered negotiations with the government. SPLA-Nasir renamed itself SPLA-United and then transformed itself, with substantial personnel changes, into the South Sudan Independence Movement/Army. Several smaller factions signed the Khartoum Peace Agreement with the government in April 1997 and formed the United Democratic Salvation Front (UDSF).

In July 1992, a government offensive seized southern Sudan, and captured the SPLA headquarters in Torit. The Sudanese government accused Uganda and Eritrea of supporting the SPLA/M, who were alleged to have operated on the Ugandan side of the Sudanese border with Uganda at the southern limit of Sudan.

In 2005, a treaty between the SPLA/M and the Sudanese government led to the formal recognition of Southern Sudanese autonomy. SPLM joined the government as part of the 2005 peace agreement, gaining about one-third of government positions. On 11 October 2007, the SPLM withdrew from the government, alleging violations of the peace agreement; this raised concerns about the future of the agreement.

In 2012, as a consequence of South Sudanese independence, SPLM became the new country's governing political party and the SPLA the country's army. The Sudan branch separated from the movement and formed SPLM-N to carry out anti-government activities in Sudan.

Factionalism
SPLM-DC (Democratic Change, 2009–present)
SPLM–N (North, 2011–present)
SPLM-IG (In Government, 2013–present)
SPLM-IO (In-Opposition, 2013–present) 
SPLM-FD (Freed Detainees, 2015–present)

As a result of the South Sudanese Civil War in 2013-2014, the SPLM factionalised into the SPLM-Juba, led by President Salva Kiir, and SPLM-IO (in opposition), led by former Vice President Riek Machar.

Notable people
 

Abdullah Albert, South Sudanese politician
Zakaria Chol Gideon Gakmar (1957–2010), Sudanese politician  
Barnaba Okony Gilo, South Sudanese politician

References

Further reading

External links
Who's who in SPLM-Juba
Garang's Death: Implications for Peace in Sudan by the International Crisis Group, 9 August 2005 (PDF)
Sudan Photographic Exhibition – Documentary photographer's images of Sudan's displaced

 
Factions of the Second Sudanese Civil War
Guerrilla organizations
Political parties established in 1983
Political parties in South Sudan
Rebel groups in Sudan
Rebel groups in South Sudan
Separatism in Sudan
National liberation armies